The 2007 Radivoj Korać Cup is the 5th season of the Serbian men's national basketball cup tournament. It was the first cup tournament of Serbia. The Žućko's Left Trophy was awarded to the winner FMP from Belgrade.

Venue

Qualified teams

1 League table position after 11 rounds played

Bracket
Source: Serbian Government

Quarterfinals

Semifinals

Final

See also 
 2006–07 Basketball League of Serbia
 Milan Ciga Vasojević Cup

References

External links 
 History of Radivoj Korać Cup

Radivoj Korać Cup
Radivoj
Serbia